Yury Gelman (born October 13, 1955) is a Ukrainian-born American five-time Olympic fencing coach for the United States (Sydney, Athens, Beijing, London, and Rio 2016), National Men's Sabre Coach, and Head Fencing Coach for 2001 NCAA champion St. John's University. Gelman is a founder of the Manhattan Fencing Center in New York City and has prepared 22 students for the United States National Teams.

Biography

Ukraine
Gelman, who is Jewish, was born in Kiev, Ukraine, where he taught fencing to elite athletes. His maternal grandmother was Esther Krakovitch. Gelman graduated in 1977 from Kiev Physical Education College, with a degree in physical education and coaching of fencing, and in 1981 earned a master's degree in physical education from Kiev. 

Gelman's coaching experience began at the Kiev Physical Education College, where he was coach from 1977-91. Gelman also served as coach of the Ukrainian Fencing Team from 1987-91.

United States
He moved to New York in 1991. He couldn’t find work in the US in fencing, so he spent a year and a half selling doughnuts at a flea market on a New Jersey highway.

Gelman then served as the fencing coach at St. John’s University in New York City for since 1995.  In 2007 he opened the Manhattan Fencing Center.

In the 2001 Junior World Championships, Gelman's students Ivan Lee and Tim Hagamen were the first to bring a gold medal to the United States. The US National Team, under Gelman's leadership, won the 2001 Gdansk Junior World Championships, the 2004 team Grand Prize, 4th Place at the 2004 Summer Olympics in Athens, 5th place at the 2005 Leipzicg Senior World Championship, and the silver medal at the 2008 Summer Olympics (Keeth Smart, Tim Morehouse, James Williams, and Jason Rogers). In the Rio 2016 Summer Olympics, Daryl Homer won a historic silver medal in men's sabre fencing. He became the first U.S. men's silver medalist since William Grebe in 1904. The U.S. Women's Sabre Team won a bronze medal (with Dagmara Wozniak and Monica Aksamit winning bronze medals in the Women's Sabre Team Competition, coached by Gelman).

Gelman was inducted into US Fencing Hall of Fame on July 10 at the 2010 Summer National Championships in Atlanta.

See also
List of USFA Hall of Fame members

References

External links 
 Manhattan Fencing
 Biographical data of Yury Gelman

1955 births
Living people
American fencing coaches
American Olympic coaches
American people of Ukrainian-Jewish descent
Jewish American sportspeople
 Jewish Ukrainian sportspeople
Sportspeople from Kyiv
Piddubny Olympic College alumni
St. John's Red Storm coaches